Attalea colenda is a species of palm tree native to Colombia and Ecuador.

References

Trees of Colombia
Trees of Ecuador
colenda